"Zemrën e lamë peng" is a song by Albanian singer Olta Boka, written by Pandi Laço to music by Adrian Hila. It was released as a CD single in 2008 through Radio Televizioni Shqiptar (RTSH). Musically, it is an Albanian-language ballad, lyrically revolving around lovesickness and the pain of separation from a loved one. The song represented  in the Eurovision Song Contest 2008 in Belgrade, Serbia, after winning the country's pre-selection competition Festivali i Këngës 46. The country reached the 17th place in a field of 25, gathering a total of 55 points. During her dark-themed show, Boka was on stage accompanied by three instrumentalists, while the LED screens displayed various violet and yellow-coloured hearts.

Background and composition 

In 2007, Olta Boka was announced as one of the contestants selected to compete in the 46th edition of Festivali i Këngës, a competition to determine Albania's entrant for the Eurovision Song Contest 2008. Following the competition's rules, the lyrics of the participating entries had to be in the Albanian language. Boka took part with the song "Zemrën e lamë peng", composed by Adrian Hila and written by Pandi Laço. For the purpose of the singer's Eurovision Song Contest participation, the song was remastered and reworked in Italy with few modifications leading to a more "rhythmic version". Musically, it was described as a ballad, which lyrically revolves around lovesickness and the pain of separation.

Release and promotion 

The song was released as a CD single in 2008 through Radio Televizioni Shqiptar (RTSH), while approximately 1000 promotional CD's were distributed to radio stations. An accompanying music video for the song premiered prior to the start of the Eurovision Song Contest 2008. For promotional purposes, Boka made diverse live appearances on multiple occasions in April that year to perform the song, including in Azerbaijan, Georgia and Ukraine. In the same month, she also appeared to perform on the Turkish television shows Aynadan yansıyanlar and Michael show. Israel's representative for the Eurovision Song Contest 2008, Boaz Ma'uda, released in 2009 a Hebrew version of the song titled "Sha'ar Libach".

At Eurovision

Festivali i Këngës 

The national broadcaster of Albania, Radio Televizioni Shqiptar (RTSH), organised the 46th edition of Festivali i Këngës to determine the country's participant for the Eurovision Song Contest 2008. The former consisted of two semi-finals on 14 and 15 December, and the grand final on 16 December 2007, which included Boka being chosen to represent the country in the contest, after the votes of an expert jury were combined, resulting in 67 points. Boka's victory was surrounded by controversy after several observers accused the Radio Televizioni Shqiptar (RTSH) of conspiracy and manipulation.

Belgrade 

The 53rd edition of the Eurovision Song Contest took place in Belgrade, Serbia, and consisted of two semi-finals on 20 and 22 May, and the grand final on 24 May 2008. However, the top ten countries from the respective semi-final progressed to the grand final. On 28 January 2008, it was announced that "Zemrën e lamë peng" would be performed in the second semi-final of the contest.

Albania performed sixth in the second semi-final, following  and preceding , and qualified for the grand final in ninth place with 67 points. At the grand final, it performed third, following  and preceding . Albania reached the 17th place in a field of 25 with 55 points. During her dark-themed show of the song, Boka was accompanied on stage by two guitarists and a drummer. The LED screens in the background displayed various violet and yellow-toned hearts throughout the performance.

Track listing 
CD 
"Zemrën e lamë peng"2:57
Digital download
"Zemrën e lamë peng (Festivali i Këngës)"3:28

Release history

References 

2007 songs
2008 songs
2007 singles
2008 singles
Eurovision songs of 2008
Eurovision songs of Albania
2000s ballads
Festivali i Këngës songs
Albanian-language songs
Songs written by Pandi Laço